Sione Mone Tu'ipulotu (born 28 November 1976 in Ha'apai, Tonga) is a Tongan rugby union footballer. His usual position is at scrum-half, but he can also play as a fullback.

He played in Wales for Caerphilly RFC (2001–2003) and the Newport Gwent Dragons (2003–2006), before moving to Yokogawa in Japan.

Tu'ipulotu made his debut for Tonga against Wales on 16 November 1997, aged only 19. He played at two Rugby World Cup finals, in 1999 and 2007, earning two and four caps at the respective tournaments. He had 27 caps, with two tries and a drop goal scored, 13 points in aggregate, for Tonga, by the end of the competition.

His daughter, Sisilia, is also a professional rugby player who plays for Gloucester-Hartpury Women and the Wales national team, and his nephew Carwyn Tuipulotu plays for the Scarlets.

References

External links
Newport Gwent Dragons profile
 

1976 births
Living people
Tongan rugby union players
Rugby union scrum-halves
Dragons RFC players
Expatriate rugby union players in Japan
People from Haʻapai
Tonga international rugby union players
Plymouth Albion R.F.C. players
Expatriate rugby union players in England
Expatriate rugby union players in Wales
Tongan expatriate rugby union players
Tongan expatriate sportspeople in England
Tongan expatriate sportspeople in Wales
Tongan expatriate sportspeople in Japan